Vĩnh Tế may refer to:

Vĩnh Tế Canal, a canal in Mekong Delta, Vietnam
Vĩnh Tế (commune), a rural commune of Châu Đốc city